The Toronto International Dragon Boat Race Festival (TIDBRF), is an annual dragon boat race and cultural event, first held in Toronto, Ontario, Canada in 1989. It developed from the Toronto Chinese Business Association held in Toronto, Ontario. An associated festival highlights Asian and other culture in Toronto.

Venue 
Races were originally held at the Ontario Place West Channel at Ontario Place, and since 2007 races have taken place in the Main Channel at Centre Island, one of the Toronto Islands.

Format and Rules 
Races occur over two days. Once separated into Community and Corporate categories, races were combined into the following categories for the 18th (2006) festival:
 Premier Mixed (at least 8 women)
 Premier Women (all women)
 Junior Mixed (at least 8 girls)

In addition to divisional finals seeded by aggregate time from two heats, there are also industry finals for teams representing groups in certain categories. In 2006, these were:
 Community groups
 Non-profit groups and charities
 Universities
 Other education groups
 Hospitals
 Industries
 Breast cancer survivors
 Technology & Communications companies
 Pharmaceutical companies

References
 Toronto Star GTA Section June 25. 2005 B3

External links
 Official Website
 Toronto Chinese Business Association - principal organizer
 Dragon Boat Canada
 Dragon Boat Net - The Paddlers Site
 Dragon Boat World Magazine - The World's Leading Dragon Boat Magazine

Dragon boat racing
Water sports in Canada
Festivals in Toronto
Toronto Islands
Boat festivals